Betabaculovirus is a genus of viruses, in the family Baculoviridae. Arthropods serve as natural hosts. There are 26 species in this genus.

Taxonomy
The following species are assigned to the genus:

 Adoxophyes orana granulovirus
 Agrotis segetum granulovirus
 Artogeia rapae granulovirus
 Choristoneura fumiferana granulovirus
 Clostera anachoreta granulovirus
 Clostera anastomosis granulovirus A
 Clostera anastomosis granulovirus B
 Cnaphalocrocis medinalis granulovirus
 Cryptophlebia leucotreta granulovirus
 Cydia pomonella granulovirus
 Diatraea saccharalis granulovirus
 Epinotia aporema granulovirus
 Erinnyis ello granulovirus
 Harrisina brillians granulovirus
 Helicoverpa armigera granulovirus
 Lacanobia oleracea granulovirus
 Mocis latipes granulovirus
 Mythimna unipuncta granulovirus A
 Mythimna unipuncta granulovirus B
 Phthorimaea operculella granulovirus
 Plodia interpunctella granulovirus
 Plutella xylostella granulovirus
 Spodoptera frugiperda granulovirus
 Spodoptera litura granulovirus
 Trichoplusia ni granulovirus
 Xestia c-nigrum granulovirus

Structure
Viruses in Betabaculovirus are enveloped. Genomes are circular, around 80-180kb in length. The genome codes for 100 to 180 proteins.

Life cycle
Viral replication is nuclear. Entry into the host cell is achieved by attachment of the viral glycoproteins to host receptors, which mediates endocytosis. Replication follows the dsDNA bidirectional replication model. Dna templated transcription, with some alternative splicing mechanism is the method of transcription. The virus exits the host cell by nuclear pore export, and  existing in occlusion bodies after cell death and remaining infectious until finding another host. Arthropods serve as the natural host. Transmission routes are fecal-oral.

References

External links
 ICTV Report: Baculoviridae
 Viralzone: Betabaculovirus

Baculoviridae
Virus genera